Thierry Frémont (born 24 July 1962) is a French actor. He has appeared in more than 60 films and television shows since 1984. He starred in the 1991 film Fortune Express, which was entered into the 41st Berlin International Film Festival.

Selected filmography
 The Cruel Embrace (1987)
 Fortune Express (1991)
 Merci la vie (1991)
 Zie 37 Stagen (1997)
 Nadia and the Hippos (1999)
 Le fils du Français (1999)
 The Secret Book (2006)
 Les Brigades du Tigre (2006)
 Djihad ! (2006)
 The Round Up (2010)
 Djinns (2010)
 The Silence of Joan (2011)
 A Happy Event (2011)
 Zarafa (2012) - Moreno (voice)
 Allied (2016) Paul Delamare
 Transferts (2017, TV series) - Paul Dangeac
 Das Boot (2018, TV series) - Duval

References

External links

 Thierry Fremont official Web site

1962 births
Living people
French male film actors
French male television actors
20th-century French male actors
21st-century French male actors
French National Academy of Dramatic Arts alumni
Cours Florent alumni
International Emmy Award for Best Actor winners
Most Promising Actor César Award winners